Hirwaun Pond Halt railway station served the industrial estate in Hirwaun, in the historical county of Glamorganshire, Wales, from 1941 to 1964 on the Vale of Neath Railway.

History 
The station was opened on 23 July 1941 by the Vale of Neath Railway. It didn't appear in the timetable as it only served the workers of the Ordnance Factory. It later closed but reopened along with the industrial estate. The station closed on 15 June 1964.

References 

Disused railway stations in Rhondda Cynon Taf
Beeching closures in Wales
Former Great Western Railway stations
Railway stations in Great Britain opened in 1941
Railway stations in Great Britain closed in 1964
1941 establishments in Wales
1964 disestablishments in Wales